Paola Fantato (13 September 1959) is an Italian former archer, who won 8 medals (5 gold) at the Summer Paralympics.

She participated also in the 1996 Summer Olympics.

Biography
At age 8 she contracted poliomyelitis, and has been a wheelchair user ever since. She competed in archery at five consecutive Summer Paralympic Games from 1988 to 2004 and won a total of five gold medals, one silver, and two bronzes. She participated in both the 1996 Summer Olympics and Paralympics, taking a bronze medal in women's individual and a gold in women's team at the Paralympic Games. She won gold medals in both the individual and team events for archery at the 2000 Summer Paralympics, and took gold and silver at the 2004 Paralympics.

See also
 List of athletes who have competed in the Paralympics and Olympics
 Italian multiple medallists at the Summer Paralympics
 Walk of Fame of Italian Sport

References

External links
 

1959 births
Living people
Italian female archers
Olympic archers of Italy
Paralympic archers of Italy
Paralympic gold medalists for Italy
Paralympic silver medalists for Italy
Paralympic bronze medalists for Italy
Paralympic medalists in archery
Archers at the 1996 Summer Olympics
Archers at the 1988 Summer Paralympics
Archers at the 1992 Summer Paralympics
Archers at the 1996 Summer Paralympics
Archers at the 2000 Summer Paralympics
Archers at the 2004 Summer Paralympics
Medalists at the 1996 Summer Paralympics
Medalists at the 2000 Summer Paralympics
Medalists at the 2004 Summer Paralympics
Medalists at the 1988 Summer Paralympics
Medalists at the 1992 Summer Paralympics
20th-century Italian women